The 62nd Pennsylvania Volunteer Infantry was an infantry regiment that served in the Union Army during the American Civil War.

Service
The 62nd Pennsylvania Infantry was organized at Pittsburgh, Pennsylvania beginning July 4, 1861 and mustered in on August 31, 1861, as the 33rd Pennsylvania Regiment for a three-year enlistment under the command of Colonel Samuel W. Black. Its designation was changed to 62nd Pennsylvania Infantry on November 18, 1861.

The regiment was attached to Morrell's Brigade, Fitz John Porter's Division, Army of the Potomac, to March 1862. 2nd Brigade, 1st Division, III Corps, Army of the Potomac, to May 1862. 2nd Brigade, 1st Division, V Corps, to July 1864.

The 62nd Pennsylvania Infantry mustered out August 15, 1864. Companies L and M were transferred to the 91st Pennsylvania Infantry. Veterans and recruits were transferred to the 155th Pennsylvania Infantry.

Detailed service
Left Pennsylvania for Washington, D.C., August 31, 1861. Camp near Fort Corcoran, defenses of Washington, D.C., until October 1861, and near Fall's Church, Va., until March 1862. Moved to the Peninsula March 22–24. Reconnaissance to Big Bethel March 30. Howard's Mills, near Cockletown, April 4. Warwick Road April 5. Siege of Yorktown April 5 – May 4. Hanover Court House May 27. Operations about Hanover Court House May 27–29. Seven Days before Richmond June 25 – July 1. Battles of Mechanicsville June 26; Gaines's Mill June 27; Savage Station June 29; Turkey Bridge or Malvern Cliff June 30; Malvern Hill July 1. At Harrison's Landing until August 16. Movement to Fort Monroe, then to Centreville August 16–28. Second Battle of Bull Run August 30. Battle of Antietam September 16–17. Shepherdstown Ford September 19. Blackford's Ford September 19. Reconnaissance to Smithfield October 16–17. Battle of Fredericksburg December 12–15. Expedition to Richard's and Ellis' Fords, Rappahannock River, December 30–31. Burnside's second Campaign, "Mud March," January 20–24, 1863. At Falmouth until April. Chancellorsville Campaign April 27 – May 6. Battle of Chancellorsville May 1–5. Middleburg June 19. Upperville June 21. Battle of Gettysburg July 1–3. Pursuit of Lee July 5–24. Duty on line of the Rappahannock until October. Bristoe Campaign October 9–22. Advance to line of the Rappahannock November 7–8. Rappahannock Station November 7. Mine Run Campaign November 26 – December 2. Duty at Bealeton Station until May 1864. Rapidan Campaign May 4 – June 12. Battle of the Wilderness May 5–7. Laurel Hill May 8. Spotsylvania May 8–12. Spotsylvania Court House May 12–21. Assault on the Salient May 12. North Anna River May 23–26. Jericho Ford May 25. Line of the Pamunkey May 26–28. Totopotomoy May 28–31. Cold Harbor June 1–12. Bethesda Church June 1–3. Before Petersburg June 16–18. Siege of Petersburg until July 3. Left front July 3.

Casualties
The regiment lost a total of 258 men during service; 17 officers and 152 enlisted men killed or mortally wounded, 89 enlisted men died of disease.

Commanders
 Colonel Samuel W. Black – killed in action at the Battle of Gaines's Mill
 Colonel Jacob B. Sweitzer
 Lieutenant Colonel James C. Hull

Notable members
 Private Philip M. Shannon, Company C – oil tycoon

See also

 List of Pennsylvania Civil War Units
 Pennsylvania in the Civil War

References
 Dyer, Frederick H. A Compendium of the War of the Rebellion (Des Moines, IA:  Dyer Pub. Co.), 1908.
 The Sixty-Second Pennsylvania Volunteers in the War for the Union: Dedicatory Exercises at Gettysburg, September 11, 1889 (Pittsburgh, PA: Barker), 1889.
 Spisak, Ernest D. Pittsburgh's Forgotten Civil War Regiment: A History of the 62nd Pennsylvania Volunteer Infantry & the Men Who Served with Distinction (Tarentum, PA: Word Association Publishers), 2013.  
Attribution

External links
 62nd Pennsylvania monument at Gettysburg

Military units and formations established in 1861
Military units and formations disestablished in 1864
Units and formations of the Union Army from Pennsylvania